Cascade High School is a public high school in unincorporated Marion County, Oregon, United States, with a Turner postal address. The district administration facility is on the same property as the high school and the junior high school. It is a part of the Cascade School District.

Its school district includes Turner, Aumsville, Marion, and a small portion of Salem.

Academics

In 2008, 90% of the school's seniors received a high school diploma. Of 202 students, 181 graduated, one dropped out, six received a modified diploma, and 14 were still in high school in 2009. 618 parking spaces.

Notable alumni
 Jess Lewis - All-American linebacker at Oregon State University and the Houston Oilers
 Tyrell Williams - NFL Wide receiver for the Oakland Raiders
 Ryan Thompson - MLB pitcher for the Tampa Bay Rays

References

External links

 Cascade High School

High schools in Marion County, Oregon
Turner, Oregon
Public high schools in Oregon